Homicide is a 1991 American crime film written and directed by David Mamet. The film's cast includes Joe Mantegna, William H. Macy, and Ving Rhames. It was entered in the 1991 Cannes Film Festival.

Plot
Bobby Gold is a homicide detective on the trail of Robert Randolph, a drug-dealer and cop-killer on the FBI's Ten Most Wanted List. En route to nab an accomplice of Randolph, Gold and his partner Tim Sullivan happen upon a murder scene: the elderly Jewish owner of a candy store in a ghetto has been gunned down, reportedly for a fortune hidden in her basement. The deceased woman's son, a doctor, uses his clout to have Gold assigned to the case in the belief that Gold, himself Jewish, might be empathetic to his plight. Gold, however, seems to disregard his ethnicity and is irritated about being pulled off a much higher-profile case. Ultimately, though, this is offset by interactions with members of the Jewish community that play on Gold's feelings of inadequacy and inability to fit in.

A nighttime survey of the crime scene uncovers an important piece of the woman's past, and Gold's reluctance turns to curiosity, leading to the discovery of a Zionist organization operating in the city. The apparent power and sense of pride these people have is appealing to Gold, and he attempts to become a part of their group. Gold is thrust into a series of circumstances that test not only his loyalty to the badge, but also his newfound Jewish consciousness.

Gold finds the old woman at one time was running guns for a Jewish liberation group. The group is attempting to protect their people from threats within the community. When asked to steal a list of group member names from police evidence to protect the group, Gold objects and is rejected by the Jewish group leaders for denying his faith.

Asking the help of a Jewish woman in the group, Gold is led to a toy shop in the city that is a secret stronghold of Nazi sympathizers, filled with anti-Jewish propaganda - proving the Jewish group's fears of danger and antisemitism were true. Gold erupts in anger, setting off the bomb given to him by the woman, destroying the stronghold/toy shop.

He is again approached by the Jewish group to retrieve the list from police evidence. When he refuses, the group shows him photographs of his acts at the toy shop, attempting to blackmail him into assisting.

During a raid to apprehend Randolph, where Gold is late to arrive due to the meeting with the Jewish group, Sullivan dies in Gold's arms, killed by gunshot. Gold, filled with rage, charges through the building and loses his gun. He wraps a rusty chain around his arm and catches up to Randolph who is attempting to escape through the basement. Randolph shoots him and talks through his last moments. Gold informs him that it was Randolph's mother that turned him in, earning him another gunshot to the arm. Gold gives him a phony passport arranged by his mother, as a police officer turns the corner and shoots Randolph in the chest, killing him.

Gold returns to the precinct to apologetic words from his fellow police officers. He comes to find the old woman was killed by a pair of young black kids, attempting to get the “fortune” hidden in her basement.

Cast

 Joe Mantegna as Bobby Gold
 William H. Macy as Tim Sullivan
 Ving Rhames as Robert Randolph
 Natalia Nogulich as Chava
 Vincent Guastaferro as Lt. Senna
 J. J. Johnston as Jilly Curran
 Lionel Mark Smith as Charlie Olcott
 Rebecca Pidgeon as Miss Klein
 Ricky Jay as Aaron
 Roberta Custer as Cathy Bates
 Charles Stransky as Doug Brown
 Bernard Gray as James
 Paul Butler as Commissioner Walker

Reception
, the film holds an approval rating of 88% on the review aggregator website Rotten Tomatoes based on 25 reviews. The website's consensus reads, "Guided by David Mamet's searing dialogue and assured direction, Homicide tells its morally complex story with an immersive mood and a crackling zeal." Roger Ebert praised it, giving it four out of four stars.

Home media
The film was released on VHS in 1992.

On September 8, 2009, the film was given a DVD release by the Criterion Collection. This director-approved release included an audio commentary with Mamet and Macy, as well as cast interviews and a gag reel.

References

External links
 
 
 
 
Homicide: What Are You, Then? an essay by Stuart Klawans at the Criterion Collection

1991 films
1990s English-language films
1991 crime drama films
Films directed by David Mamet
Films with screenplays by David Mamet
Films set in Baltimore
Films about Jews and Judaism
American crime drama films
1990s American films